The 1903 Miami Redskins football team was an American football team that represented Miami University during the 1903 college football season. Under head coach Peter McPherson, Miami compiled a 1–4 record.

Schedule

References

Miami
Miami RedHawks football seasons
Miami Redskins football